George Moloney (1909–1983) was an Australian rules footballer for Claremont and Geelong.

George Moloney may also refer to three other Australian rules footballers:
George Moloney (footballer, born 1894) (1894–1959), played for South Melbourne
George Moloney (footballer, born 1924) (1924–2005), played for South Melbourne
George Moloney (footballer, born 1939) (born 1939), played for Essendon

See also
George Maloney (1928–2003), American baseball umpire